Released in Japan in 2013 as The Signal and the Noise. The album was updated, re-recorded and released internationally in 2015 as More Signal More Noise. These are the eighth and ninth studio albums by the British band Asian Dub Foundation.

Track listings
The Signal and the Noise:
"Zig Zag Nation" - 3:49
"The Signal And The Noise" - 3:20
"Radio Bubblegum" - 4:16
"Qutub Minar" - 4:20
"Stand Up" - 4:58
"Hovering" - 4:52
"Straitjacket" - 3:58
"Get Lost Bashar" - 3:40
"Bnadh Bhenge Dao (ADF Version)" - 3:29
"Blade Ragga" - 6:06
"Your World Has Gone" - 3:19 (featuring vocals by Shama Rahman)
"Dubblegum Flute Flavour" - 5:29
"Psychosamba (Bonus Track For Japan)" - 4:43

More Signal More Noise:

Personnel 
The following personnel are credited to this album:
 
 Steve Chandra Savale a.k.a. Chandrasonic - Guitar, vocals, programming, producer
 Aniruddha Das a.k.a. Dr Das - Bass, programming
 Aktar Ahmed - Lead Vocals
 Ghetto Priest - Lead vocals
 Nathan "Flutebox" Lee - Flute, Flute beatboxing
 Rocky Singh - Drums

Additional personnel credited:

 "Zig Zag Nation"; Naga MC - rap; Amy True, Maniman - vocals.
 "The Signal and the Noise"; Chandra Walker - Additional; Prithpal Rajput - Dhol; Daljinder Singh Virdee - Alghoza (twin flutes).
More Signal More Noise (2015) only:

Qaushig Mukherjee and Neel Adhikari (Gandu Circus) - Vocals on "Fall of the House of Cards".
 Tanaji Dasgupta, Damini Roy, Kamalika Banarjee - Adicional vocals on "Fall of the House of Cards".
Suomo - Khol (percussion) on "Fall of the House of Cards".

Reception 
Louder Than War gave the More Signal More Noise a very positive review calling it "... possibly their finest album yet." and stating it is "Loud, proud and jam-packed full of superbly arranged and produced tracks ...". NME rated the album as mediocre, they praised its "audacious" sonics but said some of the lyrics covered "cringe song topics".

References

External links
 The Signal And The Noise on Discogs

2015 albums
Asian Dub Foundation albums